Center Square is an unincorporated community in Jefferson Township, Switzerland County, in the U.S. state of Indiana.

History
A post office was established at Center Square in 1867, and remained in operation until it was discontinued in 1907.

Geography

References

Unincorporated communities in Switzerland County, Indiana
Unincorporated communities in Indiana